Lipovtsi (plural) and Lipovets (singular) may refer to:

Lipka Tatars of the Grand Duchy of Lithuania. 
Lipovans of Besarabia. 
Founders of Lypovets Raion 
Lipovtsy, a village in Primorsky Krai. 

Language and nationality disambiguation pages